This page details the qualifying process qualifying for the 1992 African Cup of Nations in Senegal. Senegal, as hosts, and Algeria, as title holders, qualified automatically.

Preliminary round

Mauritania won 3–2 on aggregate.

Qualifying round

Group 1

Group 2

Following this match, all of Ethiopia's players and coaching staff were fired, forcing the team to withdraw. The remaining matches of Ethiopia were all awarded 2–0 to the opponents.

Group 3

Awarded 0–2 as Mauritania withdrew

Group 4

Group 5

Group 6

Group 7

Group 8

Qualified teams
The 12 qualified teams are:

External links
 African Nations Cup 1992

Qual
Qual
1992
1992 African Cup of Nations